Central Market is an American gourmet grocery store chain owned by H-E-B Grocery Company based in San Antonio, Texas.  Most locations also have a full-service kitchen, offer cooking and wine classes in their culinary school, and offer catering services. The chain has ten locations, all in Texas. Central Market was named "Outstanding Specialty Food Retailer" by Specialty Food Magazine and the National Association for Specialty Food Trade.

History
The original store opened in 1994 in the Central Park Shopping Center on North Lamar Boulevard in Austin, Texas.

It was not long before H-E-B Grocery Company expanded the chain to Alamo Heights, Fort Worth, Dallas and Houston. The chain's second store opened in 1997 in a converted H-E-B on Broadway in the San Antonio area (in the Alamo Heights city limits). Two years later, a third store was opened on South Lamar in Austin. Fort Worth and Houston were introduced to the chain for the first time in 2001, with stores on West Freeway and Westheimer, respectively; the latter was on the former site of Fox owned-and-operated television station KRIV. Central Market's sixth and seventh stores opened in 2002 on East Lovers Lane in Dallas and Coit Road in Plano. Continuing its Dallas/Fort Worth area expansion, an eighth store opened at The Shops of Southlake in Southlake on December 6, 2006, and another store opened at Preston Road and Royal Lane in the Preston Hollow neighborhood of Dallas on February 15, 2012. Their latest store opened on September 5, 2018,  Dallas Texas' 3rd store, located at Midway Road and Northwest Highway.

Central Market specialties
Central Market is known for its Café on the Run. The chain also carries a line of exclusive organic products called Central Market Organics. The product line includes organic or all-natural items ranging from commodities such as milk and eggs to pasta sauce and cookie dough.

Central Market deliberately limits floor space allocated to packaged products, allowing more space for fresh produce, meat and seafood, bulk products, and chef-prepared items. The produce section stocks items such as crab-apples, Meyer lemons, sweet limes, and pink lemons that are hard to find at other stores. The limited space for packaged products is devoted primarily to items that cannot be found at other supermarkets. Other aisles follow the same pattern with an emphasis on local, imported, organic, and gourmet brands rather than standard supermarket products.  Central Market also offers a wide variety of sushi which is made in house by sushi chefs. The company that provides the sushi is called Yummi Sushi based out of Farmers Branch, TX.

Live music 

As appropriate for a store that first began in Austin, the self-styled "Live Music Capital of the World", most Central Market locations feature a patio with live music on several nights each week.

References

External links
Official site

Retail companies established in 1994
Companies based in Austin, Texas
Organic food retail organizations
Privately held companies based in Texas
Supermarkets of the United States
1994 establishments in Texas